Kendo for the 2013 World Combat Games was held at St. Petersburg Sports and Concert Complex Hall 2, in Saint Petersburg, Russia. The competition took place on 21–22 October 2013.

Medal table

Medal summary

Men

Women

References

Kendo
2013 World Combat Games events